The following is a sortable list of films produced in Italy in 1962.

See also

1962 in film

Notes

References

External links
Italian films of 1962 at the Internet Movie Database

Lists of 1962 films by country or language
1962
Films